Patrobus cinctus is a species of ground beetle in the family Carabidae. It is found in Europe and Northern Asia (excluding China) and North America.

References

 Riley K, Browne R (2011). "Changes in ground beetle diversity and community composition in age structured forests (Coleoptera, Carabidae)". ZooKeys 147: 601–621.

Further reading

 Arnett, R.H. Jr., and M. C. Thomas. (eds.). (2000). American Beetles, Volume I: Archostemata, Myxophaga, Adephaga, Polyphaga: Staphyliniformia. CRC Press LLC, Boca Raton, FL.
 
 Richard E. White. (1983). Peterson Field Guides: Beetles. Houghton Mifflin Company.

Patrobus
Beetles described in 1860